This is a list of academic journals published by the American Society of Mechanical Engineers.

List

See also
 Mechanical Engineering (magazine)

References

External links
List on ASME website

American Society of Mechanical Engineers
Mechanical engineering journals